Bankkajen is a quay and a street passing along the western shore of the islet Helgeandsholmen in Gamla stan, the old town in central Stockholm, Sweden.

The name was adopted in 1925, after other proposals such as Banknäset ("Bank Neck") and Bankstranden ("Bank Shore") had been investigated.  The quay was reinforced in 2002.

See also
List of streets and squares in Gamla stan

References

Streets in Stockholm